The 2021 Internazionali di Tennis Città di Todi was a professional tennis tournament played on clay courts. It was the 15th edition of the tournament which was part of the 2021 ATP Challenger Tour. It took place in Todi, Italy between 12 and 18 July 2021.

Singles main-draw entrants

Seeds

 1 Rankings are as of 28 June 2021.

Other entrants
The following players received wildcards into the singles main draw:
  Flavio Cobolli
  Francesco Forti
  Francesco Passaro

The following player received entry into the singles main draw using a protected ranking:
  Viktor Galović

The following players received entry into the singles main draw as alternates:
  Facundo Díaz Acosta
  Skander Mansouri

The following players received entry from the qualifying draw:
  Matteo Arnaldi
  Arthur Cazaux
  Giovanni Fonio
  Matheus Pucinelli de Almeida

The following player received entry as a lucky loser:
  Franco Agamenone

Champions

Singles

 Mario Vilella Martínez def.  Federico Gaio 7–6(7–3), 1–6, 6–3.

Doubles

 Francesco Forti /  Giulio Zeppieri def.  Facundo Díaz Acosta /  Alexander Merino 6–3, 6–2.

References

Internazionali di Tennis Città di Todi
2021
2021 in Italian tennis
July 2021 sports events in Italy